The York School (TYS) is a gender inclusive JK to Grade 12 independent school located in Toronto, Ontario. The York School was founded in 1965 and is the first school in Canada accredited to offer the International Baccalaureate (IB) from Junior Kindergarten (JK) to university entrance (Grade 12).

History
In 1965, Barbara Goodwin-Zeibots established The York School as a nursery school. In 1978, the school added a toddler program as well as an elementary school. The first Grade 8 class graduated in 1985. The Senior School was founded in 1995 with the addition of a Grade 9 class.

In the late 1990s, 1320 Yonge Street was purchased through the "Home of Our Own" capital campaign. In September 2010, The York School opened a second campus at 1639 Yonge Street, which houses the Junior School (JK-Grade 5).

Goodwin-Zeibots remained the Head of School until retiring in the spring of 2006. She was succeeded by Ezio Crescenzi. In 2011, Conor Jones became Head of School.

The location at 1320 Yonge Street houses the Middle and Senior School campus for Grades 6-12. In 2015, The York School celebrated its 50th anniversary and announced a Capital Campaign to raise $5 million for the renovation of the Middle and Senior School campus at 1320 Yonge Street. The renovation is now complete.

In April 2019, Conor Jones resigned as head of school and Struan Robertson stepped in as interim head of school until December 2019, when he was appointed as full-time head of school.

Program
The York School is an IB World School and was the first in Canada to offer all three levels of the International Baccalaureate Programme (Primary Years Programme K-5, Middle Years Programme 6-10 and Diploma Programme 11-12),also known as the IB Continuum.

The school also offers a variety of outdoor education programmes and excursions both locally and internationally.

Campuses
The York School has two campuses in midtown Toronto, which are both situated on Yonge Street near St. Clair Avenue. The JK–Grade 5 students are located at 1639 Yonge Street, while Grades 6–12 are at 1320 Yonge Street, on the corner of Farnham Avenue.

The Principal of the Junior School is Valerie Turner. The Principal of the Middle School is Helen Gin. The Principal of the Senior School is David Hamilton. The Head of School is Struan Robertson.

Curricular and co-curricular programmes
The York School offers an experiential program for Grade 9 students called ICE (Integrated Canadian Experience), exploring Canadian history, geography, civics and literature and what it means to be Canadian. All Grade 9 students participate in this intensive programme and produce a documentary to reflect on their learning at the end of the year. The documentary is screened by parents and educators.

The York School sends a group of Grade 11 student volunteers to the Global Pathways School in India, which was co-founded by Barbara Goodwin-Zeibots.

There is a one-week excursion for all students grade 6 through 10 called Challenge Week where students travel somewhere in Canada or the United States and do a week of learning about a specific subject.

The school's Gladiator Athletics program is a part of the Conference of Independent Schools of Ontario Athletic Association.

Athletic Programs at the school include basketball, soccer, volleyball, cross-country, track and field, ultimate frisbee, squash, curling and swimming.

The York School has won +35 CISAA Championships since 2012, most recently in Alpine Skiing.

Approximately 20% of The York School's families are international. The school has provided support for students and families moving from abroad.

Tuition

As of 2022/2023, tuition is $35,000 for JK - Grade 12. There is a $300 Application Fee and upon acceptance of an offer of admission a $8,000 one-time fee to secure a place for a new student.

References

External links

Official website
The York School – Profile By OurKids.net: Canada's Private School Guide

Private schools in Toronto
International Baccalaureate schools in Ontario
Educational institutions established in 1965
1965 establishments in Ontario